Martin Wilson (born 1973 in Tuscaloosa, Alabama) is an American writer. He is best known for his award-winning debut novel What They Always Tell Us, published in 2008.

A graduate of Vanderbilt University and the University of Florida, he is currently based in New York City, where he works in marketing and publicity for HarperCollins.

What They Always Tell Us won an Alabama Author Award for best young adult book, and was a nominee for children's/young adult literature category at the 2009 Lambda Literary Awards. The novel was also an Indie Next Selection, an ALA-ALSC Rainbow List Selection, and a CCBC Choices Book. His second novel, We Now Return to Regular Life, was published in 2017.

Wilson has also published short stories. In 2010, he contributed an essay about John Donovan's influential LGBT teen novel I'll Get There. It Better Be Worth the Trip to the 2010 book The Lost Library: Gay Fiction Rediscovered.

References

External links
Martin Wilson

1973 births
American male novelists
21st-century American novelists
American gay writers
Writers from Tuscaloosa, Alabama
Novelists from Alabama
Vanderbilt University alumni
University of Florida alumni
Living people
American LGBT novelists
LGBT people from Alabama
American writers of young adult literature
American male short story writers
21st-century American short story writers
21st-century American male writers